An oral food challenge is a method for determining if a person has a specific food allergy. It involves giving increasing amounts of a food and watching to see if an allergic reaction occurs. They are potentially dangerous.

References

Food allergies
Medical tests